"Live" is a song by Japanese pop-rock act Superfly. It is the first new song by the project following their 2012 album Force, and serves as the band's 17th single. It was released on May 14, 2014, on standard and limited edition versions.

Background
It is described as a large-scale ballad which Superfly's vocalist and lyricist Shiho Ochi said was meant to be an inspiring piece, much like her previous collaboration with the Ushijima films' "The Bird Without Wings". The album's first B-side , which is also used in Ushijima 2, is described as an uptempo piece with 1980s inspired guitar and synthesizer. The third track on the release is "The Long Way Home".

The limited edition of the single will include a DVD that has a selection from Superfly's performance at the 2010 Fuji Rock Festival.

Chart performance
"Live" peaked at number 8 on the Oricon Weekly Single Sales Chart and 7 on the Billboard Japan Hot 100.

Track listing

References

External links
"Live" on Superfly-web.com

2014 singles
Superfly (band) songs
2014 songs
Japanese film songs
Warner Music Japan singles